John von Neumann, also known as John von Neumann Gargoyle and Portrait Head of von Neumann, is an outdoor 1987 copper sculpture by Wayne Chabre, attached to the exterior of Deschutes Hall on the University of Oregon campus in Eugene, Oregon, United States.

The sculpture depicts the Hungarian-born American mathematician John von Neumann. The relief head is made of hammered copper sheet and measures approximately  x  x . It cost around $2,500. The sculpture's condition was deemed "treatment needed" by Smithsonian Institution's "Save Outdoor Sculpture!" program in 1993. It is administered by the University of Oregon.

The piece is one of a series by Chabre at the Eugene campus that includes scientists and mathematicians Albert Einstein (Einstein Gargoyle, 1986), Sir Isaac Newton (Isaac Newton Gargoyle), Marie Curie (Marie Curie Gargoyle, 1989), James Clerk Maxwell (Maxwell & Demon Gargoyle, 1989), Alan Turing (Alan Turing, 1988), John von Neumann, and Thomas Condon; a fruit fly (Drosophila Fly Head, 1988); and a school of zebrafish.

See also

 1987 in art

References

1987 establishments in Oregon
1987 sculptures
Busts in Oregon
Copper sculptures in Oregon
John von Neumann
Monuments and memorials in Eugene, Oregon
Outdoor sculptures in Eugene, Oregon
Sculptures by Wayne Chabre
Sculptures of men in Oregon
University of Oregon campus